Elias Milton Ammons (July 28, 1860 – May 20, 1925) served as the 19th Governor of Colorado from 1913 to 1915. Born in 1860 in Macon County, North Carolina, he is perhaps best remembered for ordering National Guard troops into Ludlow, Colorado during the Colorado Coalfield War, which resulted in the Ludlow Massacre. He was also instrumental in starting the National Western Stock Show, which is still active. His son Teller Ammons was also governor of Colorado.

Early life
On July 28, 1860, Ammons was born in Macon County, North Carolina. Ammons' parents were Jehu R. and Margaret Ammons. His father was a Baptist minister and his mother was descended from the Pennsylvania Dutch.

In 1871, Ammons and his family moved to Denver, Colorado. In 1880, Ammons graduated from East Denver High School in Denver, Colorado.

Ammon's sister was Theodosia Grace Ammons, who later became a faculty at Colorado State University, and president of the Colorado Equal Suffrage Association.

Career 
In 1886, at age 26  Ammons started a cattle business in Colorado.

Legislative
On November 4, 1890, Ammons won the election unopposed and became a Republican member of Colorado House of Representatives from Douglas County. Ammons began his term on January 7, 1891. On November 8, 1892, as an incumbent, Ammons won the election unopposed and continued serving as a Republican member of Colorado House of Representatives, until January 2, 1895. Ammons served as speaker from 1894 to 1896. After becoming a Democrat, Ammons served in the Colorado State Senate from 1898 to 1902. Ammons publicly debated Gifford Pinchot, chief of the United States Department of Agriculture's Division of Forestry and head of the federal government's conservation movement, three times between 1901 and 1909.

Governorship
On November 5, 1912, Ammons won the election and became a Democratic Governor of Colorado. Ammons defeated Edward P. Costigan, Clifford C. Parks, Charles A. Ashelstrom, John Henry Ketchum, and Jonathan U. Billings with 42.91% of the votes. On January 14, 1913 Ammons served as Governor of Colorado, until January 12, 1915.  Ammons was elected on an anti-conservation platform and was against federal control of Colorado lands. He believed strongly in the sovereignty of the states and worried that the federal government was encroaching on the political independence of Colorado. Further, he was concerned that federal land reservation would stunt Colorado's economic growth.

While governor, Ammons was accused of favoring the mine owners and companies, particularly John D. Rockefeller, Jr.'s Colorado Fuel & Iron, during the 1913 to 1914 strike and civil unrest known as the Colorado Coalfield War.

Ammons left office on January 12, 1915, and retired from public service.

Personal life 
On January 29, 1889, Ammons married Elizabeth Fleming in Denver, Colorado. They had five children, including 
Bruce, Elizabeth, Teller.

Ammons had contracted a severe case of the measles that permanently impaired his eyesight.

Ammons' son Bruce Ammons became a rancher in Grand county, Colorado. He also secretly married Margaret Gates.

Ammons' daughter Elizabeth Ammons, became an accomplished equestrienne. She married Henry Louis Larsen and later became the First Lady of American Samoa and First Lady of Guam.
Ammons' son Teller Ammons became a Governor of Colorado.

On May 20, 1925, Ammons died in Denver, Colorado. Ammons is interred at Fairmont Cemetery in Denver, Colorado.

References

External links
Governor Elias M. Ammons Collection at the Colorado State Archives

 Elias Milton Ammons at ballotpedia.org
 Elias M. Ammons at ourcampaigns.com

1860 births
1925 deaths
Colorado Democrats
Colorado Republicans
Colorado state senators
Governors of Colorado
Democratic Party governors of Colorado
Members of the Colorado House of Representatives
People from Macon County, North Carolina
Speakers of the Colorado House of Representatives
Burials at Fairmount Cemetery (Denver, Colorado)